Colton is an unincorporated community in northwestern Washington Township, Henry County, Ohio, United States.  It has a post office with the ZIP code 43510.  It is located along County Road 4A, approximately four miles north of U.S. Route 24.

History
Colton was platted in 1855. A post office was established at Colton in 1856, and remained in operation until 1984.

References

Unincorporated communities in Ohio
Unincorporated communities in Henry County, Ohio